Brij M. Moudgil is an American materials scientist and engineer, focusing in developing structure-property-performance correlations in particulate materials based nanoengineered systems for enhanced performance in bioimaging, diagnosis and therapies, micro-electronics, advanced materials, energy, and water purification applications.  He is currently a Distinguished Professor at University of Florida.

In 2002, he was elected a member of the National Academy of Engineering for advances in mineral processing through innovations in selective polymer and surfactant coatings, and for professional leadership.

References

Year of birth missing (living people)
Living people
University of Florida faculty
American materials scientists
21st-century American engineers
Members of the National Academy of Medicine